Hilton Conceição de Sousa (born 8 December 1985), known as Hiltinho, is a Brazilian footballer who plays as a midfielder for 4 de Julho.

Career statistics

References

External links

1985 births
Living people
Brazilian footballers
Association football midfielders
Campeonato Brasileiro Série B players
Campeonato Brasileiro Série C players
Campeonato Brasileiro Série D players
Maranhão Atlético Clube players
Associação Cultural e Desportiva Potiguar players
Sampaio Corrêa Futebol Clube players
Boa Esporte Clube players
Clube Náutico Capibaribe players
Itumbiara Esporte Clube players
Paysandu Sport Club players
Cuiabá Esporte Clube players
América Futebol Clube (RN) players
Ferroviário Atlético Clube (CE) players
Clube Náutico Marcílio Dias players
Club Sportivo Sergipe players
4 de Julho Esporte Clube players